Hydrothorax is a type of pleural effusion in which transudate accumulates in the pleural cavity. This condition is most likely to develop secondary to congestive heart failure, following an increase in hydrostatic pressure within the lungs. More rarely, hydrothorax can develop in 10% of patients with ascites which is called hepatic hydrothorax. It is often difficult to manage in end-stage liver failure and often fails to respond to therapy.

Pleural effusions may also develop following the accumulation of other fluids within the pleural cavity; if the fluid is blood it is known as hemothorax (as in major chest injuries), if the fluid is pus it is known as pyothorax (resulting from chest infections), and if the fluid is lymph it is known as chylothorax (resulting from rupture of the thoracic duct).

Treatment
Treatment of hydrothorax is difficult for several reasons.  The underlying condition needs to be corrected; however, often the source of the hydrothorax is end stage liver disease and correctable only by transplant. Chest tube placement should not occur.  Other measures such as a TIPS procedure are more effective as they treat the cause of the hydrothorax, but have complications such as worsened hepatic encephalopathy.

See also 
 Pleural effusion
 Pneumothorax

References

https://www.sciencedirect.com/topics/pharmacology-toxicology-and-pharmaceutical-science/hydrothorax
Garbuzenko D.V., Arefyev N.O. Hepatic hydrothorax: An update and review of the literature. World J. Hepatol. 2017; 9 (31): 1197-1204

External links 

Diseases of pleura